"The Singles" is the title of the promotional release from Jars of Clay in support of their radio singles "Collide" and "No One Loves Me Like You", from their third album, If I Left the Zoo. "Collide" was intended for airplay on Christian Hit Radio and Christian Rock formats, while "No One Loves Me Like You" was intended for airplay on Christian AC and Inspirational radio stations. This song also appears on the WOW 2000 compilation album.

Track listing
All songs written by Charlie Lowell, Dan Haseltine, Matt Odmark, & Stephen Mason, unless otherwise noted.
"Collide" - 4:44
"No One Loves Me Like You" - 3:48
0:60 Public Announcement for DC/LA 2000

Charts
 No. 1 Christian CHR ("Collide")
 No. 14 Christian AC ("No One Loves Me Like You")

2000 singles
Jars of Clay songs
Essential Records (Christian) singles
1999 songs
Songs written by Dan Haseltine
Songs written by Matt Odmark
Songs written by Stephen Mason (musician)
Songs written by Charlie Lowell